The Putna is a right tributary of the river Moldova in Romania. Upstream from its confluence with the Putna Mare (Pârâul Roșu) it is also called Putna Mică. It discharges into the Moldova in Pojorâta.

Tributaries

The following rivers are tributaries to the river Putna:

Left: Chiril, Putnișoara, Șandru
Right: Putna Mare (or Pârâul Roșu), Văcăria, Iacob, Tiniș, Pârâul Frumos (or Frumosu), Cârstea

References

Rivers of Romania
Rivers of Suceava County